Kimberly A. Reed (born March 11, 1971) is an American attorney who served as the Chairman and President of the Export–Import Bank of the United States from 2019 to 2021. She was sworn in on May 9, 2019.

Reed previously served as a senior advisor to Treasury Secretaries John W. Snow and Henry Paulson.

Reed headed the United States delegation to the inauguration ceremony of South African President Cyril Ramaphosa in Pretoria on May 28, 2019.

Early life and education
Reed is a native of Buckhannon, West Virginia. Her father Terry Reed was a special assistant to the late Republican Governor Arch Moore. She has a brother and two sisters.

Reed earned her undergraduate degree from West Virginia Wesleyan College and a J.D. degree from West Virginia University College of Law. While she was an undergraduate, Reed interned for the Heritage Foundation.

References

1971 births
Living people
West Virginia Republicans
People from Buckhannon, West Virginia
West Virginia University College of Law alumni
West Virginia Wesleyan College alumni
Export–Import Bank of the United States people
Trump administration personnel
American women lawyers
21st-century American women